The Miami RedHawks college football team compete as part of the National Collegiate Athletic Association (NCAA) Division I Football Bowl Subdivision, representing the Miami University in the Eastern Division of the Mid-American Conference (MAC). Miami has played their home games at Yager Stadium in Oxford, Ohio since 1983.

Miami has 23 conference championships with 12 postseason bowl game appearances and 7 bowl game victories. The RedHawks have also had 13 undefeated seasons, a longest winning streak of 14 games between 2003 and 2004 and a home winning streak of 14 games between 1973 and 1975, and also between 1980 and 1982.

Football was introduced to the university in 1888. The first win in the history of the program came the following year, a 44–0 shutout over Dayton High School on November 9, 1889. From 1888 to 1910, Miami competed as a football independent, before they joined the Ohio Athletic Conference (OAC) in 1911. From 1911 to 1927, Miami saw some success as they had only three losing seasons and four conference championships. In 1928, Miami left the OAC and became a charter member of the Buckeye Conference. As a member of the Buckeye Conference, Miami won conference championships in 1932, 1933, and 1936.  In 1939 the conference dissolved and Miami competed independently again.

By 1948 Miami joined the MAC, where it remains today. Miami won the first MAC title in its inaugural year. Miami leads the MAC with 16 conference titles.

Seasons

Totals

Notes

References

Miami RedHawks

Miami RedHawks football seasons